The DF was a type of diesel-electric locomotive used in the People's Republic of China. It was first introduced in 1958 and was produced until 1974. It was the first common locomotive in China and was used for both passenger and freight services. The DF3 is an upgraded model of the DF.

History 

The DF design was based on a 1958 built prototype, the Julong, which was essentially a Soviet TE3 and was built with Soviet technical assistance. The DF used a 10-cylinder opposed piston engine of type 10E207. This was a copy of the Soviet 2D100 design, itself a copy of the Fairbanks Morse 38D8 ¾. Like the TE3s, the DFs were designed to be used in pairs, back to back, but appear to have spent most of their lives working singly, hardly a problem when there were wyes everywhere to turn steam locomotives.

DF and DF3 were used in many parts of China but by the late 1980s, more modern diesels, such as the DF4B, had ousted them from primary routes. Some hung on in CNR service until the mid 1990s but few, if any, made it beyond the millennium. A number of redundant locos were bought by industrial and local railway operators, including the Heihe Local Railway in northern Heilongjiang. Heihe's had finished by 2008 and it's highly unlikely that any remain in service.

Named locomotive 
 DF3-0058: "Zhou Enlai"

Manufacturers 
DFs have been manufactured by several factories:
 Dalian Locomotive Works
 Qishuyan Locomotive Works
 Datong Locomotive Works
 Chengdu Locomotive Works

Preservation

Static preservation 
 DF-1205: is preserved at Jiagedaqi Locomotive Depot, Harbin Railway Bureau.
 DF-1206: is preserved at Liuzhou Railway Vacational Technical College
 DF-1301: is preserved at China Railway Museum.
 DF-2058: is preserved at Yunnan Railway Museum.
 DF-2207 is in Luohu District, Shenzhen.

Other vehicles 
 JL-0001: made by Dalian Locomotive Works in September 1958. However, the JL Locomotive was scrapped in 2000s.
 3 DFs belong to Yunnan Smelter: DF-2026, DF-2012, DF-1683.

Vietnam Railways D16E 
These three DF Locomotives were imported from China and were numbered 2006 -2008. The main photo above depicts D16E - 2008 outside the Yen Vien Locomotive Workshop. They were apparently used for Yen Vien - Dong Dang freights and were rated at 1800 hp but were down rated to 1600 hp in VN service. It would appear that at least one locomotive has survived (at least up to 2004) and is stored at the back of a shed in Yen Vien. There is a suggestion also that the original 3 were somehow cannibalised when parts became scarce.

See also
 China Railway DF4, the successor model of DF

Notes

References 

Diesel-electric locomotives of China
Diesel-electric locomotives of Vietnam
Co-Co locomotives
Railway locomotives introduced in 1958
Standard gauge locomotives of China
Standard gauge locomotives of Vietnam